Calciborite, CaB2O4, is a rare calcium borate mineral.

It was first described in 1955 in the Novofrolovskoye copper–boron deposit, near Krasnoturinsk, Turinsk district, Northern Ural Mountains, Russia. It occurs in a skarn deposit formed in limestone adjacent to a quartz diorite intrusive. It occurs associated with: sibirskite (another rare calcium borate mineral), calcite, dolomite, garnet, magnetite and pyroxene. It has also been reported from the Fuka mine of Okayama Prefecture, Japan.

References

Calcium minerals
Inoborates
Orthorhombic minerals
Minerals in space group 56
Geology of Russia